Nauen station is a railway station located in the town of Nauen, Brandenburg, Germany. The station lies on the Berlin–Hamburg railway and the train services are operated by Deutsche Bahn and Ostdeutsche Eisenbahn.

Train services
The station is served by the following services:

Regional services  Wismar - Schwerin - Ludwigslust - Wittenberge - Berlin - Cottbus
Local services  Nauen – Falkensee – Berlin
Local services  Nauen – Falkensee – Berlin – Flughafen BER - Terminal 1-2

References

Railway stations in Brandenburg
Railway stations in Germany opened in 1848
Buildings and structures in Havelland (district)